The Higher Secondary School Certificate is a secondary qualification in Bangladesh, India and Pakistan.

The Higher Secondary Certificate (HSC) is a public examination credential in Bangladesh, India, and Pakistan.  HSC is equivalent to GCE AS-Level in England and 3rd and 4th year of high schools in the United States.

India 
In India, the HSC/Intermediate and PUC Certificates is known as "Class 12th Certificate" and also known as  "+2 Certificate". It is awarded to senior high school students by almost all National and State Boards and It is also awarded to junior college students by some state boards. It is awarded after successful completion of exams like Higher Secondary Exam, PUC Exam, Intermediate Exam,SSC (Senior School Certificate)Exam etc. It is conducted at the state level by the state boards of education like Kerala Board of Public Examination (KBPE), Board of Secondary Education, Rajasthan (BSER), Maharashtra State Board of Secondary and Higher Secondary Education(MSBSHSE), Board of Intermediate Education, Andhra Pradesh (BIEAP),  Karnataka School Examination and Assessment Board (KSEAB), West Bengal Council of Higher Secondary Education (WBCHSE), Bihar School Examination Board (BSEB) etc and at the national level by the national boards of education like Central Board of Secondary Education (CBSE) as All India Senior School Certificate Examination (AISSCE), Council for the Indian School Certificate Examination (CISCE) as Indian School Certificate (ISC), and National Institute of Open Schooling (NIOS). CBSE conducts it once a year and NIOS twice a year in public examinations with an option of on-demand examinations. On the other hand, the 10th class exam which is also conducted at state level by the state boards of education and at the national level by the Central Board of Secondary Education and in India this exam is known as SSC exam. There are a total of up to six subjects; out of these five are main subjects and one is additional in HSSC exam, which are different for different State Board but common in case of Central Board of Secondary Education.

HSSC exam consists of total 1100 marks: 550 in HSSC 1 and 550 in HSSC 2. Students can sit supplementary/improvement exams in September/October or by the new rule of fbise, next year with HSSC 2 Examination.

Bangladesh 
The Board of Secondary and Higher Secondary Education in Bangladesh recognises "Higher Secondary Education" under the clause 1(5) of the "Board of Trustees". Higher Secondary Education comprises (a) general, (b) vocational, (c) technical, or (d) special education with the combination of varied courses. It is the continuation of the "Secondary Education Courses" and it precedes the " Tertiary Education" governed by the Universities. Class XI - XII is the range of "Higher Secondary Education" that roughly covers 16-17 years of age group youth in the context of Bangladesh. 

After 10 years of schooling at the primary and secondary level, maybe years of passing students (16+) who succeed in passing the Secondary School Certificate (SSC) examination have the option of joining a college for a two-year higher secondary education in respective areas of specialization or enrolling in a technical or polytechnic institute. After the two-year higher secondary education based on the national curriculum, one has to sit for the public examination called the Higher Secondary Certificate examination conducted by the education boards.

Students of Islamic religious and English medium streams also sit for their respective public examinations, Alim and A-Level, conducted by the Bangladesh Madrasah Education Board, London/Cambridge University and Pearson Edexcel to qualify for further education. Every year, the HSC exam usually starts in April in Bangladesh, and the routine gets published two months before the examination.

There are nine Boards of Intermediate and Secondary Education responsible for conducting the public examinations also responsible for recognizing the private educational institutes.

Because of the COVID-19 pandemic, after a lot of speculation and considerations, the concerned authority decided not to arrange a Higher Secondary Certificate or equivalent examination for the year 2020. Results from two prior exams, JSC and SSC, were averaged and used as the score.

In 2021, the date and subjects of HSC exam were revised to abridge for the first time. The HSC Exam was held on 2nd December and continued till 30th December with only three major subjects for the each group of the students. 26,784 institutions participated in the exam under nine education boards together with 16,35,240 candidates.

Higher Secondary Certificate Examination 
The Board of Intermediate and Secondary Education conducts the public examinations like: "Secondary School Certificate Exam (SSC)" and "Higher Secondary School Certificate Exam (HSC), and recognizes the private sector secondary and intermediate level educational institutions.

There are eleven (11) education Boards to conduct their tasks:

 Board of Intermediate and Secondary Education, Dhaka.
 Board of Intermediate and Secondary Education, Rajshahi.
 Board of Intermediate and Secondary Education, Cumilla.
 Board of Intermediate and Secondary Education, Jashore.
 Board of Intermediate and Secondary Education, Chattogram.
 Board of Intermediate and Secondary Education, Barishal.
 Board of Intermediate and Secondary Education, Sylhet.
 Board of Intermediate and Secondary Education, Dinajpur.
 Board of Intermediate and Secondary Education, Mymensingh.
 Bangladesh Madrassa Education Board.
 Bangladesh Technical Education Board.

"The Ordinance of the Board" is controlled by the East Pakistan Intermediate and Secondary Education Ordinance, 1961 (East Pakistan Ordinance No. XXXIII of 1961) and its amendments No. XVI of 1962 and No. XVII of 1977. Under the East Pakistan Ordinance No. XXXIII of 1961, Dhaka Board is established in 1961. In pursuance of the Presidential Proclamation on the 7th October, 1958, Rajshahi Board established in 1961 (East Pakistan Ordinance No. XXXIII of 1961). The Cumilla Board is established in 1962 in the pursuance of the amendments No. XVI of 1962. Jashore Board is established in 1963 by the Government Order- 737. Then it was named as " Intermediate and Secondary Education Board, Khulna Division, Jashore" though it was renamed in 1965 as " Intermediate and Secondary Education Board, Jashore". The Technical Board was established on the 7th March, 1967 in pursuance of the Gazette no- 175. The Madrassa Education Board is established under "The Madrasa Education Ordinance No. IX of 1978" in 1978. The Chattogram Education Board is established in 15th May, 1995, Brishal Education Board is established in August 23, 1999, Sylhet Board is established in 1999, and Dinajpur Board is established in 22nd October, 2006. The Government forms a new Education Board in Mymensingh in August, 2017; now the total education board becomes 11

Pakistan

The Higher Secondary School Certificate (HSSC), also known as Intermediate, is a public examination taken by the students of Higher Secondary School or Intermediate college (Junior college) in Pakistan. After finishing Matriculation in Grade 9 and 10, the students then enter an intermediate college and complete grades 11 and 12. Upon completion of each of the two grades, they again take standardized tests in their academic subjects. They are offered by provincial boards at provincial level and by FBISE at the federal level. Upon successful completion of these examinations, students are awarded the Higher Secondary School Certificate (HSSC). This level of education is also called the FSc/FA/ICS. There are many streams students can choose for their 11 and 12 grades, such as pre-medical, pre-engineering, humanities (or social sciences), computer science and commerce. Each stream consists of three electives and as well as three compulsory subjects of English, Urdu, Islamiyat (grade 11 only) and Pakistan Studies (grade 12 only).

History 
The Society for Promoting Christian Knowledge (SPCK) was the first step from the British government to spread practical needs education along with religious education. In 1824, the General Committee of Public Instruction was established and it proposed to include the moral education in the India subcontinent. Then, the establishment of a Directorate of Public Instruction (DPI) was made at each province in 1854 by the proposal of the Woods Education Dispatch.

The Hunter Commission, the first education commission in India suggested the introduction of "A" Course (Literature) and "B" Course (Technical Education) and guided to establish higher education through private entrepreneurship and the government colleges to remain under divisional management. The Sadler Commission in 1917 had proposed introducing two years of university education merged among the colleges as Higher Secondary Education. Then in 1944; the Sargent Scheme proposed secondary education for children aged between 11-17 years.

The Akram Khan Committee and the Ataur Rahman Khan Commission were established consecutively in 1947 and 1957 to revise the education system. As a result, East Pakistan Secondary Education Board was established to conduct the examination of the secondary level institutions. This Board was split and 6 boards were established at each division in pursuance of the Ordinance- 1961

After the independence of Bangladesh the Government directly controlled secondary and higher secondary education and nationalized a good number of schools and colleges. The office of the Director of Public Instruction (DPI) was renamed the Directorate of Secondary and Higher Education (DSHE)] in 1981

References

Further reading
 Mohsin Bashir, and Shoaib Ul-Haq, "Why madrassah education reforms don't work in Pakistan." Third World Quarterly (2019) 40#3 pp. 595–611.
 Muhammad Qasim Zaman, "Religious education and the rhetoric of reform: The madrasa in British India and Pakistan." Comparative Studies in Society and History 41.2 (1999): 294–323 online.

Secondary education in Bangladesh
School qualifications of India
Education in Nepal
School qualifications of Pakistan
Secondary school qualifications